Jonathan Lee (born 10 June) is a Creative Director at the advertising network Havas. He is best known, however, for his work as a writer, satirist and humorist. He is best known for his satirical work and in particular his spoof diary accounts of cricket captains Andrew Strauss and Ricky Ponting. He is also the co-founder of the British humour website 7 Reasons. He currently authors the successful blog series 'Responsibilities of an adman' and lives in Fulham, London.

Work

Satire
Lee is perhaps best known for his work as the author of the spoof diaries of cricket captains Andrew Strauss and Ricky Ponting. The diaries entitled 'Strauss v Ponting: The Captain's Ashes Diaries' were first written during the 2009 Ashes in England. In November 2010, the second set of diaries were started in-line with the 2010/11 Ashes in Australia. After the 2009 Ashes, Lee created the spin-off character Sir Straussy. Based on Andrew Strauss, Sir Straussy writes about his time as England Cricket Captain. In October 2010, Sir Straussy was selected as the second funniest spoof account on Twitter by GQ Australia. In the past Lee has also spoofed Grace Kelly in ShortList magazine and the television and radio presenter Richard Bacon. Lee's spoofing of Bacon became a regular part of the host's BBC Radio 5 Live show in 2009.

7 Reasons
In October 2009, Lee started the topical humour site 7 Reasons with fellow humorist and writer Marc Fearns. The two met through Richard Bacon having both proved popular guests on Bacon's Radio 5 Live show. 7 Reasons aims to provide users with seven reasons each day for a particular topic. In December 2009 the site was selected as The Best Thing To Read by The Guardian newspaper. In late 2010 the idea was being turned into a column for the UK edition of the men's magazine Esquire.

Is This You?
Is This You? is Lee's account of his three-year quest to find his best friend's look-alike. It came about after he took a photo in Sydney in 2006 that featured what Lee believed to be his best friend. His work came to light when he started doing flash-mob book readings. The book was due for release in 2010, but has been postponed while Lee concentrates on other projects.

US iPod Challenge
When Lee appeared on Denmark's TV2 in August 2009, he said his next project was to travel across America 25 times in order to find out whether a claim made by iPod manufacturer Apple is correct. The claim states that it is possible to travel between New York and San Francisco 25 times without hearing the same song twice on an 80GB iPod.

Responsibilities of an adman
Lee's most recent body of work is a blog concerning the advertising industry and responsibilities of its members. It is published on the professional networking site LinkedIn and although less satirical than his usual output has been generally well received. The first edition, named 'Chapter A', reached up to 11 likes. His second post however has been less popular so far, containing the word 'nipples' and describing how he stares into people's flats on his commute home.

Awards
In October 2010, Sir Straussy was voted the second funniest spoof Twitter account by GQ Australia. The 2010/11 Strauss v Ponting Diaries were also voted the seventh funniest sports blog of 2010 by FHM and the twenty-sixth best blog of 2010 by The Sydney Morning Herald.

Personal life
Lee attended Colston's Collegiate School and Bristol Grammar School before studying for a degree in design at Loughborough University. In January 2011 Lee became engaged to his girlfriend who he coincidentally met through Andrew Strauss. He previously dated the Welsh singer-songwriter Duffy, and was a friend of Rachael Hodges of whom he credits as one of the biggest influencers in his career.

Notes
Former Australian cricketer Michael Slater was reprimanded by Channel 9 after quoting Sir Straussy during the channel's coverage of the Boxing Day Test Match between Australia and Pakistan in 2009. Slater publicised Sir Straussy's Twitter address which is against the code of conduct issued by Channel 9.

References

External links
 7 Reasons
 Lee's Blog
 Strauss v Ponting: The Captain's Ashes Diaries

Living people
Alumni of Loughborough University
British comedians
British male journalists
British satirists
People from Fulham
People from Loughborough
Year of birth missing (living people)